Svanvik is a locality situated in Orust Municipality, Västra Götaland County, Sweden. Its population in 2010 was 293. It is situated on Sweden's fourth largest island, Orust.

Notable Places 
Notable places around Svanvik include Skåpesundsbron 3 km (1.9 mi) south of Svanvik, and Stala Church 3 km (1.9 mi) northwest of Svanvik.

References 

Populated places in Västra Götaland County
Populated places in Orust Municipality